Deathspell Omega is a French black metal band formed in 1998 in Poitiers. Their lyrical content deals primarily with Satanism on a metaphysical level – as the band has stated that "all other interpretations of Satan are intellectually invalid" – and other various theological topics.

They have also released a trilogy of concept albums which focus on the theological aspects of God, Satan and man's relationship with the two. They released their sixth album, The Synarchy of Molten Bones, on 8 November 2016 and their seventh, The Furnaces of Palingenesia, on 24 May 2019; the last of these reflects a shift in lyrical focus to anti-authoritarian political themes. 

Some of their lyrical inspiration has also revolved around existentialist themes coming from the French surrealist Georges Bataille, whom the band has cited several times as their largest literary influence, as well as the German idealist Georg Wilhelm Friedrich Hegel. The band's eighth and current album, The Long Defeat, was released March 23rd 2022.

History 
Initially, Deathspell Omega produced raw, traditional black metal akin to Darkthrone's Transilvanian Hunger. However, their 2004 release, Si monvmentvm reqvires, circvmspice, marked a change to a vastly more technical, experimental, and well-recorded sound featuring such musical influences as Russian Orthodox chanting and choral music.

The band's work after Si monvmentvm reqvires, circvmspice has been even more experimental and technical, with their output in 2005—Kénôse, "Mass Grave Aesthetics" and "Diabolus absconditus"—totaling nearly eighty minutes in length, longer than Si monvmentvm reqvires, circvmspice. The second volume of the band's trilogy, Fas – Ite, Maledicti, in Ignem Aeternum, was released on 16 July 2007, outside the United States, and the following day within the United States, to considerable acclaim. The band released another EP in January 2009, entitled Veritas Diaboli Manet in Aeternum: Chaining the Katechon. The final album in the trilogy, Paracletus, was released by Norma Evangelium Diaboli and Season of Mist on 9 November 2010. The band's final work related to the trilogy, titled Drought, was released on 22 June 2012.

Deathspell Omega's full-length album, The Synarchy of Molten Bones, was made available early to download and stream on 31 October 2016 with a full physical release on 8 November.

There is little to no concrete information about Deathspell Omega's lineup—they do not have any official website, social media platform or promotional photos, have never performed live and do not list credits in their releases. Finnish musician Mikko Aspa of Clandestine Blaze is most commonly cited as the vocalist. Hirilorn vocalist Shaxul stated that he was Deathspell Omega's vocalist until 2002, and has gone on record as leaving due to displeasure with the band's shift in themes. Early interviews were deeply critical of the black metal scene, and the last interview they agreed to until 2019 was conducted by their North American label The Ajna Offensive, with questions and answers sent through the band's exclusive label, Norma Evangelium Diaboli, to preserve their identity. In a 2018 interview with Loudwire, Tobias Forge, lead singer of the band Ghost, stated that the French synthwave artist Carpenter Brut (Franck Hueso) was Deathspell Omega's producer.

The band's seventh full-length album, The Furnaces of Palingenesia, was released on May 24, 2019. It is presented as a manifesto from a dictator speaking for a political faction referred to as "the Order"; it is explicitly intended to deconstruct authoritarian regimes of both the left and the right. The band recorded the album live in a studio using analogue gear, and it was mastered more quietly than most of the band's preceding material, also reflecting a shift in production approach. A month later, the band conducted its first interview in fifteen years with Niklas Göransson of the website and zine Bardo Methodology, during which they discussed the album's themes in detail. The band discussed a major impetus for the interview and the album being the Doomsday Clock being at two minutes to midnight, citing concerns over the degradation of the natural environment and the growing presence of authoritarian politics. They referenced Maximillien Aue, the villainous narrator of Jonathan Littell's novel The Kindly Ones, in discussing the narration style of the album, contrasting his perspective with Winston Smith's from George Orwell's Nineteen Eighty-Four. They compared their politics to those of their largest literary inspiration, Georges Bataille, noting that Bataille opposed both the authoritarianism of the left from the Soviet Union and the authoritarianism of the right from Fascist Italy and Nazi Germany.

The band noted that a major purpose of The Furnaces of Palingenesia was to "shatter a myth that's so central to stability both on an individual and civilisational level: the impervious necessity to believe that what we do is just, that we are just, that good and evil in intent and deed are as distinct as night and day." They also argued:

 Twice, man committed the highest of crimes: by waging an absolutist war against nature and, therefore, against life itself. And, secondly, by severing the bond to nature and forging an anthropocentric worldview that places man above everything else and, therefore, can be used to justify just about anything – no matter how short-sighted or ill-advised – so long as it appears to serve mankind's interests. Extracting man from the natural order, by intent if not in effect, was a sign of hubris which remains literally without equivalent and whose resulting devastations will know no equivalent either. Listen carefully enough and you'll hear demonic snigger.

In the same interview with Göransson, without naming any of their members directly, the band also confirmed suspicions of an ideological rift within the band, noting, "A minority of the collective's contributors – shall we say, parts of the second circle – who've been invited to partake because of their incredible talents as musicians are involved with earthly politics, but stand on completely opposite ends of the political spectrum and are therefore irreconcilable political foes." However, they noted that the music and lyrics were authored by the "French core of the collective". This clarification was made in the wake of backlash against Deathspell Omega due to their long time collaboration with Mikko Aspa who has long been accused of having connections and links with various NSBM and RAC acts from both the Finnish and other scenes.

Line-up

The band has never provided any official information as to who their members are.

Discography
 Infernal Battles (2000)
 Inquisitors of Satan (2002)
 Si monvmentvm reqvires, circvmspice (2004)
 Fas – Ite, Maledicti, in Ignem Aeternum (2007)
 Paracletus (2010)
 The Synarchy of Molten Bones (2016)
 The Furnaces of Palingenesia (2019)
 The Long Defeat (2022)

Compilation albums 
 Manifestations 2000–2001 (2008, collection of material originally released on LP on the splits with Moonblood and Mütiilation and the Black Metal Blitzkrieg compilation)
 Manifestations 2002 (2008, eight previously unreleased tracks, initially written for the Crushing the Holy Trinity compilation and a planned split with Cantus Bestiae)

EPs 
 Kénôse (2005)
 Veritas Diaboli Manet in Aeternum: Chaining the Katechon (2008), standalone release of the band's contribution to the split album with S.V.E.S.T.
 Mass Grave Aesthetics (2008), originally released in 2005 on the 'From the Entrails to the Dirt' split.
 Diabolus Absconditus (2011), originally released in 2005 on the 'Crushing the Holy Trinity' split.
 Drought (2012)

Split releases 
 Clandestine Blaze / Deathspell Omega – Split (2001)
 Sob A Lua Do Bode / Demoniac Vengeance (2001, split LP with Moonblood)
 Split with Mütiilation (2002)
 From the Entrails to the Dirt (Part III) (2005, split LP with Malicious Secrets)
 Crushing the Holy Trinity (Part I: Father) (2005, V/A LP with Stabat Mater, Clandestine Blaze, Musta Surma, Mgła, and Exordium)
 Veritas Diaboli Manet in Aeternum (2008, split EP with S.V.E.S.T.)

Demos 
 Disciples of the Ultimate Void (1999, entire release is included as the final four tracks of the band's first album, Infernal Battles)

Compilation appearances 
 "Black Crushing Sorcery" on Black Metal Blitzkrieg (2001, End All Life Productions)

Box sets 
 Untitled 5LP vinyl box (2009): includes Infernal Battles, Inquisitors of Satan, Manifestations 2000–2001, Manifestations 2002, and the band's side of the split with Clandestine Blaze.
 Untitled 7LP vinyl box (2012): includes Si Monumentum Requires, Circumspice, Kénôse, Diabolus Absconditus, Mass Grave Aesthetics, Fas – Ite, Maledicti, in Ignem Aeternum, Chaining the Katechon, Paracletus, and Drought

References

External links 
 [ Allmusic biography]
 MusicMight biography

French black metal musical groups
Musical groups established in 1998
Season of Mist artists
Musical groups from Nouvelle-Aquitaine
Avant-garde metal musical groups